Dorothy Ferrell “Tommy” Angell (May 6, 1924 – January 19, 2022) was an American fencer. She competed in the women's individual and team foil events at the 1964 Summer Olympics.

References

External links
 

1924 births
2022 deaths
American female foil fencers
Olympic fencers of the United States
Fencers at the 1964 Summer Olympics
Sportspeople from Berkeley, California
Pan American Games medalists in fencing
Pan American Games gold medalists for the United States
Fencers at the 1963 Pan American Games
Fencers at the 1971 Pan American Games
21st-century American women